Isabel Dean (born Isabel Hodgkinson, 29 May 1918 – 27 July 1997) was an English stage, film and television actress.

Life and career
Born in Aldridge, Staffordshire, Dean studied painting at Birmingham Art School. In 1937, she joined the Cheltenham Repertory Company as a scenic artist. She was soon involved in acting with some small parts.

She appeared on stage in London in Agatha Christie's Peril at End House in 1940. Her stage appearances included The Deep Blue Sea, Breaking the Code and John Osborne's The Hotel in Amsterdam, at the Theatre Royal, Haymarket. In 1949 she appeared in The Foolish Gentlewoman at the Duchess Theatre in London.

By 1953, she was also appearing on British television in The Quatermass Experiment and over her career appeared in television series such as I, Claudius (1976) and Inspector Morse (1990). She appeared with Paul Scofield in an ITV Saturday Night Theatre production of The Hotel in Amsterdam broadcast on 14 March 1971.

Among her film appearances are roles in The Story of Gilbert and Sullivan (1953) and the film version of Inadmissible Evidence (1968).

Personal life
In 1953, Dean married writer William Fairchild; the couple had two daughters, Caroline and Angela. The marriage was later dissolved.

Radio
 Paul Temple and the Geneva Mystery (1965) BBC
Home at seven (1966) by RC Sherriff
 The Reluctant Peer by William Douglas-Home broadcast on BBC (1967)
 The Bird Table (1982)
 A Photograph of Lindsey Mowatt (1986) by Ellen Dryden
 Summer Attachment (1986) by Michael Sharp

Filmography

Film

Television

References

External links

Theatre performances in Theatre Archive University of Bristol

1918 births
1997 deaths
English film actresses
English television actresses
English stage actresses
20th-century English actresses
People from Aldridge
Actors from Staffordshire
People from Wandsworth